Radio SEAC was the war time radio station operated by the Allied South East Asia Command (SEAC) that took over the operations of Colombo Radio, a Ceylon radio station launched in 1925. Radio programmes were broadcast across Asia to the allied forces and to the people of India and South Asia.

Radio SEAC was handed over to the Colonial Government of after World War II who changed the name to Radio Ceylon. The station is the oldest radio station in Asia (world's second oldest). Millions tuned into Radio SEAC and subsequently Radio Ceylon.

See also

Radio Ceylon

External links 
 SLBC-creating new waves of history
Eighty Years of Broadcasting in Sri Lanka
 Sri Lanka Broadcasting Corporation

Radio stations in Sri Lanka
Radio during World War II
Radio stations established in 1925
Ceylon in World War II
British Empire in World War II

Radio stations disestablished in 1946
India in World War II